Shootin' Stars is an animated cartoon short which was released to cinemas by Paramount Pictures in 1960. In the same year, Paramount remade this cartoon for television as the Popeye episode Autographically Yours.

1960 animated films
1960 films
American animated short films
Paramount Pictures short films
1960s American films